The 1979 French Grand Prix was a Formula One motor race held on 1 July 1979 at Dijon.

It marked not just the first victory of a forced-induction car in Formula One since the Alfa Romeo 159's victory at the Spanish Grand Prix in 1951, but also the first victory of a turbocharged car in Formula One, with Renault overcoming the reliability problems that had initially plagued their car. For Jean-Pierre Jabouille it was a victory on home soil, driving a French car (Renault), on French tyres (Michelin), powered by a French engine (Renault), burning French fuel (Elf). Jabouille was the first Frenchman to win the French Grand Prix since Jean-Pierre Wimille in 1948.

The race featured one of the fiercest battles ever for second place, between Ferrari driver Gilles Villeneuve and Renault driver René Arnoux, who on several occasions during the final laps touched wheels and swapped positions. The fight is often cited as one of the most memorable pieces of racing in Formula One. Villeneuve, who passed the finish line less than a quarter of a second ahead of Arnoux, later described the occasion as "my best memory of Grand Prix racing".

Qualifying

Qualifying classification

Race

Classification

Championship standings after the race

Drivers' Championship standings

Constructors' Championship standings

Note: Only the top five positions are included for both sets of standings. Only the best 4 results from the first 7 races and the best 4 results from the last 8 races counted towards the Drivers' Championship. Numbers without parentheses are Championship points; numbers in parentheses are total points scored.

References 

French Grand Prix
French Grand Prix
Grand Prix